Xabier Fernández Gaztañaga (born 19 October 1976 in Ibarra, Gipuzkoa, Basque Country) is a Spanish sailor and olympic champion. Fernandez won a gold medal in the 49er class with Iker Martínez at the 2004 Summer Olympics in Athens.  The same pairing won the silver medal at the 2008 Summer Olympics. He has been a crewmember and skipper in the Volvo Ocean Race five times, onboard: movistar (2005–06), Telefónica Blue (2008–09), Telefónica (2011–12), and MAPFRE (2014–15, 2017–18).

He sailed with Luna Rossa Challenge in the 2013 Louis Vuitton Cup.

 2001 	World Championship 	Malcesine (Italy), 2nd position ;
 2001    European Championship 	Brest (France ), 2nd position ;
 2002 	World Championship 	Kaneohe (United States of America), 1st position ;
 2002    European Championship 	Grimstad (Norway), 1st position ;
 2003 	European Championship 	Laredo ( Spain), 3rd position ;
 2004 	Olympic Games   	Athens  ( Greece), 1st position ;
 2004    World Championship 	Athens  ( Greece), 1st position ;
 2006 	European Championship 	Weymouth (United kingdom), 3rd position ;
 2007 	European Championship	Marsala (Italy), 1st position ;
 2008 	European Championship 	S'Arena ( Spain), 1st position ;
 2008    Olympic Games           Beijing (China ), 2nd position ;

References

1976 births
Living people
Sportspeople from Gipuzkoa
Spanish male sailors (sport)
Olympic sailors of Spain
Olympic gold medalists for Spain
Olympic medalists in sailing
Medalists at the 2004 Summer Olympics
Medalists at the 2008 Summer Olympics
Olympic silver medalists for Spain
Sailors at the 2004 Summer Olympics – 49er
Sailors at the 2008 Summer Olympics – 49er
Sailors at the 2012 Summer Olympics – 49er
49er class world champions
ISAF World Sailor of the Year (male)
Volvo Ocean Race sailors
Luna Rossa Challenge sailors
2013 America's Cup sailors
World champions in sailing for Spain
People from Tolosaldea
21st-century Spanish people